Edith Jiménez (1918–2004) was a distinguished Paraguayan plastic artist.

She was born in Asunción in 1918, to Eulogio Jiménez and de Silvia González.

Beginnings

She began her painting studies with the teacher Jaime Bestard in 1943. This exponent of the painting in his country taught her the use of composition and colour which she will later use in her paintings.

In 1952 she had her first individual painting exposition in the Agustin Barrios Gallery in the “Centro Cultural Paraguayo Americano”. A year later she was nominated the official representative in painting in the second Biennial in São Paulo and participated in the organized sample of the historic revolutionary group of Paraguayan plastic “Arte Nuevo” in Palma Street, in the centre of Asunción.

She evolved with her artistic production and continued with the presentations of her works to the audience participating in numerous collective samples in Asunción, São Paulo, Buenos Aires, Caracas, Montevideo and in country sides of Paraguay.

In 1956 she began her engraved studies in the Brazilian Cultural Mission with the teacher Livio Abramo. In 1958 she received a scholarship from Brazil government  to study engraving in São Paulo, in the Modern Art Museum and in the “Gravura” studio, always under de directions of Livio Abramo. It was only a one-year scholarship but it extended to three. In 1959 she had expositions in São Paulo and Asunción.

Trajectory 

 
Josefina Plá writes : “Edith, today’s and yesterdays painter, engraver since a long time and always, continues her career cover by her pride, in her labour she gives it all, in which, remaining true to herself, can offer us something new in her sample”. And Livio Abramo: “ If we don’t find that unity of style in these series of painting, characteristic in Edith paintings, we find, on the other side, a really notable wealth of solutions and we belief the announcement of new ambitious goals. Dangerous and unknown roads….but fascinant.

As you can see, the expositions that she offered in the country and in many parts of the World positions her as the most important Paraguayan Plastic Artist in the 20th century, all of that added to the fact that her work has reached the highest recognitions and that her pieces are part of  prestigious collections like the modern art museum in Nueva York, the Estampa museum in Buenos Aires, the National Library  of Paris, the Smith College Museum of the United States and the most important museums in Paraguay.

Last years

Short time before his death and for the initiative of the plastic artist Luis Alberto Boh, it was declared by the “Junta Municipal” of Asunción as the “Dilect daughter in Asunción” with the great sculpture Hermann Guggiari.

He died on the 7 October 2004, when he was eighty six years old. Receiving the public recognition for his humanistic and artistic gifts.

References
 Centro Cultural de la República
 Diccionario Biográfico "FORJADORES DEL PARAGUAY", Primera Edición Enero de 2000. Distribuidora Quevedo de Ediciones. Buenos Aires, Argentina.

External links 
onlinedmad.com.py
onliinemad.com.py/ficha tecnica

Paraguayan engravers
1918 births
2004 deaths
20th-century engravers
21st-century engravers
Women engravers
20th-century women artists
21st-century women artists
20th-century Paraguayan painters